Joseph Aidan Forde (born 28 December 2003), is an Australian professional footballer who plays as a defender for Perth Glory. He made his professional debut in a FFA Cup playoff match against Melbourne Victory on 24 November 2021.

As a junior, Joseph played for Forrestfield United. It's unknown the age he was at while playing for Forrestfield.

Joseph is the grandson of Northern Irish Olympic footballer Hugh Forde (footballer) and great-nephew of Northern Irish professional footballer Tommy Forde.

References

External links

Living people
Australian soccer players
Association football defenders
Perth Glory FC players
National Premier Leagues players
A-League Men players
2003 births